<noinclude>

The Azov Assault Brigade is a formation of the National Guard of Ukraine formerly based in Mariupol, in the coastal region of the Sea of Azov, from which it derives its name. It was founded in May 2014 as the Azov Battalion, a volunteer paramilitary militia under the command of Andriy Biletsky to fight pro-Russian forces in the war in Donbas. It was formally incorporated into the National Guard on 11 November 2014, and redesignated Special Operations Detachment "Azov", also known as the Azov Regiment. In February 2023, the Ukrainian Ministry of Internal Affairs announced that Azov was to be expanded as a brigade of the new Offensive Guard. 

The unit has drawn controversy over its early and allegedly continuing association with far-right groups and neo-Nazi ideology, its use of controversial symbols linked to Nazism, and early allegations that members of the unit participated in torture and war crimes.  Some experts have been critical of the regiment's role within the larger Azov Movement, a political umbrella group made up of veterans and organizations linked to Azov, and its possible far-right political ambitions, despite claims of the regiment's depoliticization. Others argue that the regiment has evolved beyond its origins as street militia, tempering its neo-Nazi and far-right underpinnings as it became part of the National Guard. Since 2014, criticism of the Azov Regiment has been a recurring theme of Russian propaganda, and the unit has been designated a terrorist group by Russia since August 2022.

The regiment's size was estimated to be around 900 to 2,500 combatants in 2017–2022. Most of the unit's members are Russian speakers from Russian-speaking regions of Ukraine. It also includes members from other countries. In the wake of the 2022 Russian invasion of Ukraine, the regiment gained renewed attention, as one of the reasons given by Russian president Vladimir Putin for the invasion was the "denazification" of Ukraine, to remove the alleged control of the country by far-right forces such as Azov. During the Siege of Mariupol, the regiment played a prominent role in the city's defense, and made its final stand at the Azovstal steel plant. The siege ended when a significant number of the regiment's fighters, including its commander, Denys Prokopenko, surrendered to Russian forces on orders from the Ukrainian high command.

History

Background and founding, February–April 2014
According to anti-fascist researcher Vyacheslav Likhachev, Azov had many roots. For example, Jewish activist Nathan Khazin has described a group of around 26 activists in the Automaidan movement in 2013 who he said formed the backbone of Azov, while other sources emphasise the presence of former Patriot of Ukraine activists.

According to Katerina Sergatskova in Hromadske, parts of the Azov Brigade had its roots in a group of ultras of FC Metalist Kharkiv named "Sect 82" (1982 is the year of the founding of the group) accused of neo-Nazi leanings. In late February 2014, during the pro-Russian unrest when a separatist movement was active in Kharkiv, Sect 82 occupied the Kharkiv Oblast regional administration building in Kharkiv and served as a local "self-defense force." Soon after, a company of the Special Tasks Patrol Police called 'Eastern Corps' was formed on the basis of Sect 82, which would join Azov in 2015.

On February 2014, Andriy Biletsky, a far-right political activist, founder and leader of the ultranationalist organization Patriot of Ukraine and the related Social-National Assembly (SNA), who had been previously arrested in 2011 accused of robbery and assault, although his case had never reached the courts, was released from prison after the new government considered him a political prisoner of the former Yanukovytch government. After returning to Kharkiv, he rallied some activists from Patriot of Ukraine, SNA, the AutoMaidan movement and some ultras groups, and formed a small militia to help local security forces against the local pro-Russian movement in the city. Biletsky's militia, and later the Battalion, was known as the "Black Corps", and nicknamed by Ukrainian media as the "Men in Black" or "Little Black Men", touted as Ukraine's version of Russia's Little Green Men due to their secrecy and mystery, as well their use of all-black fatigues and masks in Kharkiv and later in Mariupol. During March 2014, as the unrest in Kharkiv worsened, the Security Service of Ukraine and the Militsiya pulled out from the city, the Black Corps started to patrol the streets, protecting pro-Ukrainian activists and attacking pro-Russian ones. On 14 March, members of the pro-Russian militant organization "Oplot" (which would later become a separatist military battalion, and the head of the Donetsk branch, Alexander Zakharchenko, would become Head of the Donetsk People's Republic) and of the Anti-Maidan movement, attempted to raid the local Patriot of Ukraine headquarters. The Black Corps retaliated with automatic weapons, and the situation escalated into a firefight between the two groups, leading to two dead on the pro-Russian side. At that time, the Black Corps had around 60 to 70 members, mostly lightly armed.

By April, during the initial phases of the war in Donbas, the Ukrainian Armed Forces suffered a number of defeats and setbacks against the separatists, as they were ill-prepared, ill-equipped, lacking in professionalism, morale, and fighting spirit, and with severe incompetence in the high command. Because of this, many civilians created militias and paramilitary groups, known as "volunteer battalions", to fight the separatists on their own initiative.

As the situation in the Donbas deteriorated, on 13 April 2014, Minister of Internal Affairs Arsen Avakov issued a decree authorizing the creation of new paramilitary forces of up to 12,000 people. The former Black Corps was initially based in Kharkiv, where they were tasked with defending the city against a possible pro-Russian uprising, but as the situation in the city subsided and calmed down, they were deployed further south to help in the war effort. They were then sanctioned by the Ukrainian Interior Ministry as a unit of the Special Tasks Patrol Police, and became officially known as the "Azov" Battalion, which was officially formed on 5 May 2014 in Berdiansk.

Initially, the militia was mostly funded independently of the state, with  Jewish-Ukrainian billionaire and oligarch Ihor Kolomoyskyi as their primary financier. When Azov deputy commander Ihor Mosiychuk made antisemitic comments about Kolomoisky, he was removed. Among other early patrons of the battalion were Oleh Lyashko, a member of the Verkhovna Rada, ultra-nationalist Dmytro Korchynsky, businessman Serhiy Taruta, and Avakov. The battalion received training near Kyiv from instructors with experience in the Georgian Armed Forces.

Special Tasks Patrol Police, May 2014 
The battalion had its baptism by fire in Mariupol in May 2014, where it was involved in combat during the First Battle of Mariupol as part of a counter-offensive to recapture the city from separatists of the self-proclaimed Donetsk People's Republic (DPR). On 13 June, together with fellow Special Tasks Patrol Police battalion Dnipro-1, they retook key buildings and strongholds occupied by separatists, killing at least 5 separatists and destroying one enemy BRDM-2 armoured vehicle and one armored truck during battle. After the battle, Azov remained as a garrison in Mariupol for a time, where they were tasked of patrolling the region around the Sea of Azov to prevent arms trafficking from Russia into separatist hands, and was briefly relocated to Berdiansk. On 10 June, the battalion dismissed deputy commander Yaroslav Honchar and distanced themselves from him after he made statements critical of looting and debauchery in the Azov battalion. Igor Mosiychuk became deputy commander.

On 10–11 August 2014 the Azov Battalion, together with the Shakhtarsk Battalion, the Dnipro-1 Battalion, and the Ukrainian Army, supported an assault on the city of Ilovaisk spearheaded by the Donbas Battalion. The performance of Azov was criticized by fellow members of the Donbas Battalion and by a later report by the commission of the Verkhovna Rada on the failures of the Battle of Ilovaisk, which criticized Azov of arriving undermanned and late to the battle, and failing to cover the flanks of other forces. During the initial assault, Azov suffered heavy losses. The Azov Battalion helped to clear the city of separatists and reinforce Ukrainian positions. However, in late August they were redeployed to garrison Mariupol once more, as a detachment of troops from the Russian Armed Forces was spotted moving into Novoazovsk, 45km east of Mariupol. Later, the separatists forces in Ilovaisk were reinforced by troops from the Russian Armed Forces, which encircled the Ukrainian forces in the city and defeated them. The commander of the Donbas Battalion, Semen Semenchenko, later accused the Ukrainian military and government of deliberately abandoning them for political reasons, citing the withdrawing of Azov and Shakhtarsk battalions as trying to start infighting between the volunteer battalions.

In the Battle of Novoazovsk from 25 to 28 August 2014 the Azov Battalion and Ukrainian forces did not fare much better, as they were pushed back by superior firepower of the tanks and armored vehicles of the separatists and Russians.

On 11 August 2014 another detachment of the Azov Battalion, backed by Ukrainian paratroopers, captured Marinka from pro-Russian rebels and entered the suburbs of Donetsk, clashing with DPR fighters.

With Novoazovsk captured, the separatists began preparing a second offensive against Mariupol. In early September 2014, the Azov Battalion was engaged in the Second Battle of Mariupol. As the separatist forces closed in on the city, the Azov Battalion were in the vanguard of the defense, providing reconnaissance around the villages of Shyrokyne and Bezimenne, located a few kilometers east of Mariupol. At the same time, Azov started to train Mariupol citizens in self-defense and organize popular militias to defend the city. The separatists were able to push far into Mariupol, reaching the outer suburbs and coming within five kilometers of the city. But an overnight counter-offensive on 4 September launched by Azov and the Armed Forces pushed the DPR forces away from the city.

Regarding the ceasefire agreed on 5 September, Biletsky stated: "If it was a tactical move there is nothing wrong with it […] if it's an attempt to reach an agreement concerning Ukrainian soil with separatists then obviously it's a betrayal." At this time, Azov had 500 members.

Reorganisation and incorporation into the National Guard of Ukraine, November 2014 
In September 2014, the Azov Battalion underwent a reorganisation, and was upgraded from a battalion to a regiment, and in 11 November, the regiment was officially enrolled into the National Guard of Ukraine. This was part of larger policy changes by the Ukrainian government of integrating the independent volunteer battalions under either the Ukrainian Ground Forces or the National Guard into the formal chain-of-command of the Anti-Terrorist Operation (ATO). The now-Azov Regiment was designated as "Military Unit 3057" and officially named the "Azov" Special Operations Detachment".

Following its official enrollment in the National Guard, Azov received official funding from the Ukrainian Interior Ministry and other sources (believed to be Ukrainian oligarchs). Around this time Azov started receiving increased supplies of heavy arms. Biletsky left the regiment in October 2014 and his influence dissipated afterwards.

On 14 October 2014, Azov servicemen took part in a march to commemorate the 72nd anniversary of the Ukrainian Insurgent Army (UPA) in Kyiv organized by the Right Sector and on 31 October 2014, deputy commander of the Azov Battalion Vadym Troyan was appointed head of Kyiv Oblast police (this police force has no jurisdiction over the city of Kyiv).

Battle of Shyrokyne, January 2015 

On 24 January 2015, Mariupol came under an indiscriminate rocket bombing by separatists, which left 31 dead and 108 injured. In 28 January, two Azov members were killed in a shelling of a checkpoint in the eastern part of Mariupol. Both attacks were conducted from an area near the village of Shyrokyne, 11km east of Mariupol, where there was significant movement of separatist troops in the region, stoking fears of a third offensive against Mariupol.

In February 2015, the Azov Regiment responded by spearheading a surprise offensive against the separatists in Shyrokyne. The objective was to create a buffer zone to prevent more bombings of Mariupol and push the separatists forces back into Novoazovsk. The attack by the Azov Regiment was reinforced by the Ukrainian Army, and Air Assault Forces, as well the Donbas Battalion of the National Guard, the independent volunteer battalions Ukrainian Volunteer Corps, and the Chechen Muslim Sheikh Mansur Battalion.

In February 2015, after breaking through DPR lines, the Azov Regiment managed to quickly capture the towns of Shyrokyne, Pavlopil, and Kominternove, and began to advance toward Novoazovsk. The Ukrainian forces were stopped in the town of Sakhanka, where the separatists held the line by using heavy artillery and armored vehicles. By 12 February 2015 the separatists launched an all-out counter-offensive which resulted in heavy losses for Azov. Azov and the rest of the Ukrainian forces retreated from Sakhanka into Shyrokyne. On 12 February 2015, the Minsk II ceasefire was signed by both parties of the conflict, and the territory around Shyrokyne was declared to be part of a proposed demilitarized buffer zone. However, the DPR rebels did not consider combat in the village itself as part of the ceasefire, while Biletsky saw the ceasefire as "appeasing the aggressor". The following weeks saw fighting continuing between Azov and the separatists, worrying some analysts that it could jeopardize the Minsk II agreement. The situation in Shyrokyne became a stalemate: both sides reinforced their positions and built trenches. In the following weeks, Azov and the DRP forces exchanged fire and artillery bombings with a back-and-forth on the control of the frontlines and villages. The village of Shyrokyne was almost completely destroyed as a result.

On 1 July 2015, the separatists withdrew from the Shyrokyne. Separatist leader Denis Pushilin declared they were pulling back as an "act of good will" to conform to the Minsk II agreements. However, Biletsky claimed the action was a result of the separatists suffering heavy casualties and not being able to sustain their operation.
On 29 July 2015 the Azov Regiment and the Donbas Battalion fighters in Shyrokyne were rotated out of the front and replaced with a unit of the Ukrainian Marines. The decision to pull them out from the village was met with protests from residents of nearby Mariupol, who feared that the withdrawal would lead to Russian separatists quickly retaking the village and shelling the city again.

In August 2015, the Ukrainian government pulled all volunteer battalions, including Azov, off the front lines around Mariupol, replacing them with regular military units. The primary base of the regiment became a seaside villa in Urzuf, a village in Donetsk Oblast. On 1 October 2015, the Azov Civil Corps joined the Blockade of Crimea. The action was started by the Mejlis of the Crimean Tatar People in 20 September as a massive traffic obstruction of transport traffic going into Russian Crimea to protest the Russian annexation of Crimea. The Tartars were soon joined by other anti-Russian activist groups, such as the Azov Civil Corps. The Azov Regiment and the Right Sector's Ukrainian Volunteer Corps paramilitaries helped provide security for the activists.

2016–2019 
On 27 April 2016, 300 troops and light-armored vehicles from the regiment were assigned to Odessa to safeguard public order after Oblast Governor Mikheil Saakashvili wrote in social media about a rash of pro-Russian "titushki" attacks on civilians. In 2017, the size of the regiment was estimated at more than 2,500 members.

In 2019 the Azov Regiment spent eight months on the frontline at Svitlodarsk arc, following more than three years of being withdrawn from the frontline. In June 2019, to commemorate the five year anniversary of the Ukrainian victory in the Battle of Mariupol, there was a military parade composed by members of the Azov Regiment, the National Guard of Ukraine, the National Police of Ukraine, and the State Border Guard Service of Ukraine.

2022 Russian invasion of Ukraine 
The Azov Regiment regained attention during the 2022 Russian invasion of Ukraine. Before the conflict, Azov was the subject of a propaganda war: Russia used the regiment's official incorporation into the National Guard of Ukraine as one of the proofs for its portrait of the Ukrainian government and military as under Nazi control, with "denazification" as a key casus belli. The regiment, on the other hand, was noted for its ability to self-promote, producing high quality videos of its drone strikes and other military activities; The Daily Telegraph called it a "well-oiled publicity machine". Others have noted how their participation in the war and defense of Mariupol have increased national and international notoriety and popularity of the unit. The regiment's destruction has been among Moscow's war objectives.

In March, France 24 described the Azov Regiment as "at the heart of the propaganda war" between Russia and Ukraine. France 24 reported that Azov posted victory claims on Telegram that are "often accompanied by videos of burning Russian tanks" and called the Russians "the real fascists". Vyacheslav Likhachev, an analyst at the ZMINA Center for Human Rights in Kyiv, stated that during the war, Azov operates in the same way as other regiments, “but with better PR”.

In January 2023, Meta decided that Azov should not be regarded as a “dangerous organization”, meaning that Facebook, Instagram, and WhatsApp users may publish content about the Azov Regiment and its members without censorship.

Defense of Mariupol 

Most of the Azov Regiment was stationed in Mariupol at the beginning of the invasion. In March 2022, Deutsche Welle reported that the regiment was the primary unit defending Mariupol in the Siege of Mariupol. As the battle raged, Azov became notable for its fierce defense of the city. For example, PBS called it "a seasoned volunteer force that is widely considered one of the country’s most capable units". On 19 March 2022, president Volodymyr Zelenskyy awarded the title of Hero of Ukraine to Azov's commander in Mariupol, Lieutenant Colonel Denys Prokopenko.

On 9 March Russia carried out an airstrike on a maternity hospital, killing multiple civilians, and justified the bombing by the alleged presence of Azov troops in the building; similarly, on 16 March, the Mariupol theatre, which was holding civilians, was bombed, Russia accused Azov of having perpetrated it, trying to frame Russia for it. As civilians fled the city, Russian checkpoints stopped men and stripped them, looking for tattoos identifying them as Azov. Refugees in "filtration centers" were interrogated if they had any affiliation with Azov or knew someone in the regiment. On 22 March, Azov's military headquarters in the northern Kalmiuskyi District were captured by Russian and DPR soldiers, although it was already abandoned.

By early April, the Azov Regiment, together with other local Ukrainian forces, started to retreat into the Azovstal iron and steel works, a massive Soviet-era steel mill built to resist military attacks and bombing. The unit became prominently associated with Azovstal; its founder Biletskiy called the industrial complex "the fortress of the Azov". On 11 April 2022, the regiment accused Russian forces of using “a poisonous substance of unknown origin” in Mariupol. The allegations, however, have not been confirmed by independent fact-checkers and organizations. Later in April, remaining pockets of Ukrainian resistance inside the city, consisting of the 36th Marine Brigade, other National Guard units, and the sea port detachments of the National Police and Border Guards, conducted operations to breakthrough into Azovstal, while members of Azov conducted support and rescue operations to assist them.

By 21 April, most Ukrainians forces in Mariupol were based in Azovstal. In 21 April, Vladimir Putin officially stated that Mariupol was "liberated" and placed an order for his forces to not storm of the complex, but instead blockade it. Nonetheless, the following days saw bombing and shelling of Azovstal. There were also civilians sheltering in the complex.

On 3 May, the Russian forces in Mariupol restarted their attacks on Azovstal. The following day it was reported that the Russians had broken into the plant.

In early May 2022 protests took place in Kyiv, organised by the families of Azov troops, Ukrainian marines and other soldiers. Kateryna Prokopenko, the wife of Denys Prokopenko, took a major role in these demonstrations, which were broken up by police. These protests accused the Ukrainian government and the international community of failing to do enough to assist wounded soldiers currently in the Azovstal steelworks. In a statement made to the press on 8 May 2022 from the steelworks, leading figures within the regiment stated that they would not surrender. They criticised the Ukrainian government for negotiating with Russia, as well as countries who refused to supply Azov with weapons in previous years. In this news conference, Svyatoslav Palamar, second in command of the Azov Regiment, accused Ukrainian politicians of cynicism for failing to visit Azovstal. He stated that the regiment could not be 100% sure all civilians had been evacuated due to lack of equipment and the fact they had not been assisted by specialist organisations. Palamar said that during the evacuation of civilians, 3 Azov soldiers had been killed and one wounded, and said that criticisms made towards the troops about the speed of the evacuation were 'extremely painful'. A Azovstal factory worker who had stayed in a bunker under the factory for two months before her evacuation told Deutsche Welle that, contrary to Russian media reports, they were not forced by soldiers in Azovstal to stay against their will, however, it became increasingly unsafe to leave due to constant bombardment.

On 10 May 2022, the Azov Regiment posted images on its Telegram page of what it said were its wounded soldiers in the bunkers of Azovstal. These images showed severe shrapnel injuries and in some cases amputated limbs which the soldiers were unable to treat properly. They called for an immediate evacuation where these soldiers could be provided with medical assistance. In an interview with the Kyiv Post, a soldier with the Azov Regiment repeated this call, alleging that he had been tortured and witnessed killings by Russian separatists when he had been captured in a previous war.

On 17 May 2022, negotiations, which included mediators from the United Nations and the International Committee of the Red Cross (ICRC), managed to end the siege of Azovstal and establish a humanitarian corridor. On 16 May, the Ukrainian General Staff announced that the Mariupol garrison, including remnants of the Azov regiment stationed in Mariupol, had "fulfilled its combat mission" and that evacuations from the Azovstal steel factory had begun. Following orders from the high command, over the next few days Azov members in Azovstal, including Prokopenko, surrendered to Russian forces among ~2.5k Ukrainian soldiers from the plant, and were taken to Russian-controlled territory of the Donetsk People's Republic. The ICRC registered the surrendered troops as prisoners of war at the request of both sides, collecting information to contact their families. Ukrainian and Russian sources make contradicting statements on the future of surrendered combatants, from pre-arranged exchange to Russian POWs with support of international humanitarian organizations, to criminal prosecution in Russia on war crime and terrorism charges. As reported by the Wall Street Journal, according to Azov chief of staff on 18 May, Ukraine had proposed a prisoner swap of the most severely wounded prisoners, but Russia had countered "everyone or noone".

Russian press secretary Dmitry Peskov said Russian president Vladimir Putin had guaranteed that the fighters who surrendered would be treated "in accordance with international standards" while Ukrainian president Volodymyr Zelenskyy said in an address that "the work of bringing the boys home continues, and this work needs delicacy – and time". Prominent Russian lawmakers, Anatoly Wasserman and Vyacheslav Volodin, called on the government to deny prisoner exchanges for members of the Azov Regiment, and try them in Russia as "nazist war criminals" instead. Leonid Slutsky suggested to lift the moratorium on death sentences in Russia to allow execution of surrendered Azov fighters. According to international human rights law professor Christina Binder at the Bundeswehr University Munich, despite Russia leaving the Council of Europe in March 2022, its provisions are effective for an additional 6 months. This leaves open the potential for a case at European Court of Human Rights in the case of torture and execution of fighters from the Azov Regiment until September 2022.

Amnesty International USA issued a statement saying that "Ukraine’s soldiers deployed in Mariupol area have been dehumanized by Russian media and portrayed in Putin’s propaganda as ‘neo-Nazis’ throughout Russia's war of aggression against Ukraine. This characterization raises serious concerns over their fate as prisoners of war", while calling for Russia to fully respect the Geneva conventions.

On 24 May 2022, The Guardian reported that Denys Prokopenko was able to briefly call his wife from the captivity, and according to him surrendered Azov fighters are being held in "satisfactory" conditions, with injured combatants held in a prison in Olenivka, and a small number of severely injured fighters held in a hospital of Novoazovsk. Presumably, none of the surrendered fighters had been taken to Russia so far.

Also on 30 May 2022, a group of family members announced the creation of a "Council of Wives and Mothers" to help ensure the surrendered soldiers are treated according to the Geneva Conventions. They noted that most of the relatives have no idea what is going on with the captured fighters, and there is no evidence of activity by the Red Cross.

On 5 June 2022, Kateryna Prokopenko told Ukrayinska Pravda that as far as she understands, international humanitarian groups such as the Red Cross were only with the surrendered soldiers during the beginning of their captivity, however, that is not true anymore. She suggested that the Russian side is restricting access to the soldiers by the Red Cross. In mid June, the lack of monitoring has continued, a provision of the surrender agreement. The Red Cross has been silent, but their fate has been brought up during a phone call by Emmanuel Macron, Olaf Scholz, and Vladimir Putin, when the western leaders called for a prisoner swap.

On 7 June 2022, Human Rights Watch and Kharkiv Human Rights Protection Group separately announced that Ukrainian refugees, as well as civilians forcibly deported to Russia, were being pressured and intimidated to implicate Ukrainian military personnel in war crimes, including implicating Azov in the Mariupol theatre airstrike.

Bodies of 210 Ukrainian fighters have been transferred to Kyiv. These are being processed by Azov's "guardianship" unit.

After a Donetsk court conducted a show trial of three foreign members of the Ukrainian Armed Forces and sentenced them to death, there was worry that the prisoners of war from Azovstal would face similar show trials, with people associated with Azov especially vulnerable due to their depiction in Russian propaganda. Some civil society members also claim that Russia wants to destabilize Ukraine by pitting the interests of captives and the victims of Russian war crimes against each other. Zelenskyy declared in early June that the defenders of Mariupol had become "public prisoners", and it was not in Russian interests to use violence against them, however, other Ukrainian sources claimed the DPR was preparing a trial against members of Azov in order to close the loop of its "denazification" of Ukraine narrative.

According to Yulia Fedosyuk, wife of Azov soldier Arseniy Fedosyuk, Russia will try and convict the Azovstal soldiers terrorism and war crimes against civilians most likely, to try and shift blame for crimes committed by Russia. She also said the Azov officers, including Prokopenko and Palamar have been moved to Lefortovo Prison in Moscow, the site of an FSB detention center, while others are in Olenivka. On 30 June, it was announced that 95 Azovstal prisoners would be exchanged, along with 43 from the Azov Regiment. It was revealed that about 1,000 Azov soldiers are still prisoners of war.

On 18 June 2022, Mykyta Nadtochiy was appointed as new commander of the Azov Regiment. According to Moskovskij Komsomolets, Nadtochiy was appointed by Prokopenko as his successor during the siege of Mariupol and was later evacuated from the city by helicopter after being wounded in action.

On 29 July 2022, at least 50 of the captured fighters died in the Olenivka prison explosion, claimed by the Russian side to be a missile airstrike by Ukrainian forces on the Olenivka prison in Donbass where they were kept, and claimed by the Ukrainian side to be a murder of prisoners by the Russian side, disguised as a false flag operation. The Ukrainian side asked the UN and Red Cross, which vouched for life and health of surrendered soldiers, for an immediate reaction to the incident.

On 22 September 2022, as part of a prisoner exchange, Ukraine handed Viktor Medvedchuk, a Ukrainian oligarch former People's Deputy of Ukraine and personal friend of Vladimir Putin over to Russia, along with another 55 Russian prisoners of war, in exchange for over 215 Ukrainian prisoners of war, including 188 members of the Azov Regiment. Prisoners exchanged included Azov commander Denys Prokopenko and his deputy Svyatoslav Palamar, along with three other leaders. In the swap it was agreed that the five leaders of the Azov Regiment that were released as part of the prisoner exchange will remain in Turkey until the end of the war. The swap caused controversy in Russia among hardliners and pro-war supporters, as in the past few months the Russian government had affirmed that the Azov prisoners were going to trial over crimes and would not be handed over in any prisoner exchanges, and had used Azov extensively in propaganda.

Other activities 

While the main bulk of the Azov Regiment was based in Mariupol, with the invasion new Azov units began to be organized outside of the city, in particular in Kyiv and Kharkiv. These units were initially part of the part of the Territorial Defense Forces of Ukraine (TDF). The Azov TDF units proved themselves to be particularly effective in combat, and thus they were turned into regiments and reassigned as part of the Special Operations Forces of Ukraine (SSO), where they received special training and equipment. These units are known as the "Azov SSO", with units in Kyiv, Kharkiv and a new one in Sumy. In May 2022, The Times reported that a new Azov unit had been inaugurated in Kharkiv, bearing a new insignia of a stylized Tryzub formed by three golden swords. In January 2023, the Azov SSO units were merged and reformed into the 3rd Separate Assault Brigade under the Ukrainian Ground Forces. It is a mechanised infantry unit with the aim of providing a highly mobile, well-armed and well-trained unit that can effectively engage in both defensive and offensive operations. In January, the unit was deployed to the Battle of Bakhmut.

In Dnipro, the 98th Territorial Defence Battalion 'Azov-Dnipro' of the Territorial Defense Forces was organized, led by First Deputy Head of National Corps and Azov veteran Rodion Kudryashov. Other Azov TDF units include the 225th and 226th Reconnaissance battalions from Kharkiv, the Azov Tank Company—part of the 127th Defense Brigade of the Kharkiv TDF—Azov-Prykarpattia formed in Ivano-Frankivsk and Azov-Poltava based in Poltava. In addition, Azov veterans and National Corps members Konstantin Nemichev and Serhiy Velychko formed the Kraken Regiment, a volunteer unit active in Kharkiv which is not part of the Ukrainian Armed Forces, but a spetsnaz unit of the Main Directorate of Intelligence. While in Volyn, Azov veterans formed the "separate special purpose unit 'Lubart'" under the TDF, a photoshoot of the unit included the flag of the Centuria Group, a far-right organization connected to Azov. Russian volunteers of Azov and other right-wing emigrants also formed their own separate unit known as the Russian Volunteer Corps.

In early April, Azov units were present at the Kyiv offensive at the Battle of Brovary, where the regiment and the Ukrainian Army's 72nd Mechanized Brigade ambushed and destroyed a Russian tank regiment advancing into the town of Brovary.

Leadership and organisation 

The brigade's first commander and founder was Andriy Biletsky. Biletsky stayed out of the public spotlight working on expanding Azov to battalion size. In summer 2014, he took command of the unit. In August 2014, he was awarded the military decoration "Order for Courage" by Ukrainian president Petro Poroshenko and promoted to the rank of lieutenant colonel in the Interior Ministry's police forces. After Biletsky was elected into the Ukrainian parliament in the 2014 Ukrainian parliamentary election he left the regiment, and terminated his contract with the National Guard in 2016 (Ukrainian elected officials can not be in the military, nor the police).
 
A 16 July 2014 report placed the Azov Battalion's strength at 300. An earlier report stated that on 23 June almost 600 volunteers, including women, took oaths to join the Donbas and Azov battalions. The unit included 900 volunteers .

Commanders 
Biletsk led Azov from its inception as a volunteer battalion in May to October 2014 when he ran for office in the 2014 parliamentary elections. From July 2017 to May 2022, the unit's commander was Lieutenant Colonel Denys Prokopenko, who became the youngest commander in the history of the armed forces of Ukraine. In May 2022, the unit's second in command was Captain Svyatoslav Palamar, who was captured by Russian forces and later released in a prisoner swap. On 18 June 2022, Mykyta Nadtochiy was appointed as new commander of the Azov Regiment.

The commander of the second battalion of the Azov Special Operation Forces, Kyiv regiment is Dmytro Kukharchuk.

Status
Azov was initially formed as a volunteer militia in May 2014. In 2015, the Ukrainian government decided to turn all volunteer battalions—both the Territorial Defence Battalions associated with the armed forces, and the Special Tasks Patrol Police of the interior ministry—into regular units of the Ukrainian Armed Forces and the National Guard, respectively. Azov is one of the latter. The Ukrainian government also opted to deploy only volunteer units to the Donbas front, pledging that conscripts would not be sent into combat.

In January 2015, Azov Regiment was officially upgraded to a regiment and its structures took a definite shape. A mobilization center and a training facility were established in Kyiv, in the former industrial complex "ATEK" for selection and examination. The personnel, composed of volunteers from all over Ukraine, had to pass through a screening and vetting process, quite similar to army's mobilization procedures. Recruits were then assigned to the combat units of the regiments, or to support and supply units, where they undertake intensive combat drills training. Reconnaissance and Explosive Ordnance Disposal (EOD) units were considered the élite of Azov and were manned by the most experienced personnel (typically, former Ukrainian Army special forces or similar).

In February 2023, acting Minister of Internal Affairs Ihor Klymenko announced that Azov was to be expanded from its regimental status as one of eight assault brigades of the new Offensive Guard Corps. The Offensive Guard is to be an all-volunteer formation of eight assault infantry brigades, six of the National Guard, one of the Border Guard, and one under the National Police, anticipated to be fully active by April 2023.

Foreign fighters 

According to The Daily Telegraph in August 2014, the Azov Battalion's extremist politics and professional English social media pages had attracted foreign fighters, including people from Brazil, Italy, the United Kingdom, France, the United States, Greece, Sweden, Spain, Slovakia, Croatia, Czechia, and Russia.

While the February 2015 Minsk II Ceasefire Agreement speaks of the withdrawal of foreign fighters, the agreement was never fully implemented.
Though only about 50 Russian nationals were members of the Azov regiment in April 2015, the regiment still included foreign fighters in August 2015, for example an ex-British army serviceman Chris Garrett and a 33-year-old former soldier of the Greek army and French Foreign Legion known by the nom-de-guerre of "The Greek". Investigative journalist Michael Colborne wrote that by 2015 the regiment had largely lost interest in recruitment of foreigners, "let alone in forming international friendships". However, he noted that the same could not be said for the broader Azov movement, especially the National Corps political party.

In late 2016, Brazilian investigators uncovered an alleged plot to recruit Brazilian far-right activists for the Azov-aligned Misanthropic Division. American white nationalists have unsuccessfully tried to join Azov. In 2016, Andrew Oneschuk, who later joined the neo-Nazi terrorist group Atomwaffen Division, joined an Azov movement podcast in 2016. Azov has cultivated ties with the Atomwaffen Division.

According to the Counter Extremism Project, the Azov Regiment made clear in 2019 that it was no longer accepting foreigners, since foreigners could only serve in the Ukrainian Army as contractors. However, during the 2022 Russian invasion of Ukraine it once again actively recruited foreign volunteers.

In 2019, support for the Azov Movement and associated organizations was temporarily not allowed under Facebook's Dangerous Individuals and Organizations policy. In 2021, Time reported on the use of Facebook by the Azov Movement to recruit far-right individuals from other countries, reporting instances from 2018. During the 2022 Russian invasion of Ukraine the Dangerous Individuals and Organizations policy was relaxed. In 2019, the FBI had arrested a 24-year-old American soldier for a bomb plot, who had wanted to travel to Ukraine to join the regiment. In 2020, Ukraine deported two American Atomwaffen members who wanted to join the regiment. A Ukrainian official told Buzzfeed News that for anyone to join the regiment, official channels had to be used.

In June 2022, Kacper Rekawek wrote in Combating Terrorism Center at West Point that "Ukrainian units with far-right histories are now deeply integrated into Ukraine’s armed forces and eschew foreign recruitment, and one of those units, the Azov Regiment, was decimated during the siege of Mariupol. Very few foreign right-wing extremists have been recruited into Ukraine’s International Legion. In fact, anecdotal evidence suggests most of the foreign fighters who have traveled this year to fight on the Ukrainian side are fighting to safeguard Ukraine’s future as a Western democracy. All this means that while Western governments should keep a watchful eye on foreign fighter flows to Ukraine, they must also counter Russian disinformation efforts that massively inflate the presence of right-wing extremists on the Ukrainian side."

Russian Azov volunteers formed their own separate unit as a response to the Russian invasion, known as the Russian Volunteer Corps.

Azov movement 

The Azov Battalion has created its own civilian political movement, collectively known as the "Azov movement", made up of an umbrella of organizations formed by former Azov veterans or groups linked to Azov, and with roots in the ultranationalist paramilitary Patriot of Ukraine group led by Azov founder Andriy Biletsky and the associated far right Social-National Assembly.

In 2017, according to Foreign Affairs magazine, "After the union [with the National Guard], the government's first act was to root out two groups within Azov, foreign fighters and neo-Nazis, by vetting group members with background checks, observations during training, and a law requiring all fighters to accept Ukrainian citizenship. Fighters who did not pass this screening were offered the chance to join civilian volunteer corps to help the war effort; these corps assisted police, cleared snow (a crucial task in Ukraine), and even worked on a public radio." According to Reuters, at this time, the unit worked to depoliticize itself: its far-right leadership left and founded the National Corps political party, which works with its associated activist organization, the Azov Civil Corps. The Patriot of Ukraine websites were shut down or put under restricted access.

Some experts agree with the view that there is increasingly great separation between the Azov Movement and the Azov Battalion. Kacper Rękawek, a research fellow with the Center for Research on Extremism at the University of Oslo, told CNN that, "People always assume it [the Azov regiment and Azov movement] is one Death Star. Year by year, the connections [between the regiment and the movement] are looser." Anton Shekhovtsov, an expert on Russia's connections to Europe's far-right, told the Financial Times that though it was originally formed by leadership of a neo-nazi group, "It is certain that Azov [the battalion] has depoliticised itself. Its history linked to the far-right movement is pretty irrelevant today."

Other experts, however, disagree with these assessments, and point to specific cases where there have been interactions between the regiment and the broader movement. Oleksiy Kuzmenko of Bellingcat in a 2020 article, noted that soldiers from the regiment appeared together with leaders of the "National Corps" political party in a 2020 video ad for a rally, and that a 2017 YouTube video appeared to show the émigré Russian neo-Nazi Alexey Levkin giving a lecture to the regiment. Both entities have admitted to being part of the wider "Azov Movement" led by Biletsky, who worked directly with Arsen Avakov (Minister of the Interior until July 2021) on matters relating to the regiment.

Similarly, Michael Colborne wrote that it "would be a mistake to claim...that the Azov regiment is somehow not a part of the broader Azov movement" and points to repeated description of the regiment as the "military wing" of the Azov movement by Olena Semenyaka, the main international representative of the movement. Colborne also stated "the Azov movement tries to be a one-stop shop for all things far right. There’s also a bevy of loosely affiliated but more extreme subgroups under its umbrella as well, including open neo-Nazis who praise and promote violence". In late 2021, prior to the Russian invasion of Ukraine, he said the movement had become less strong since 2019, as a result of infighting and the group needing to temper most of its international outreach activity due to high-profile attention.

Biletsky uses Azov fighters to pursue his own political goals. For example, to put pressure on President Zelensky and prevent him from reaching compromises with Russia, Azov veterans marched into Kiev reaching his office and clashing with the police.

In 2022, there have been continued reports of Biletsky interacting with the regiment, including his own claims that he is in daily contact with the current leader of Lt. Col Prokopenko and other Azov soldiers during the Siege of Mariupol. According to commentary by far right watcher Vyacheslav Likhachev, Biletsky's main goal is to exploit the Azov "trademark" in political life, and that although it is no secret that he was in touch with the regiment, his role is limited to an informal one.

Azov Civil Corps 
In spring of 2015, veterans of the Azov volunteer battalion created the core of a non-military non-governmental organization Azov Civil Corps, for the purpose of "political and social struggle".

National Corps 
In 2016, veterans of the regiment and members of the Azov Civil Corps founded the political party National Corps. The party advocates for a stronger government control over politics and economy, completely breaking ties with Russia and opposes Ukraine joining both the European Union and NATO. The party's first leader was Andriy Biletsky. According to an expert in a 2022 article by Bayerischer Rundfunk, there is an "incompatibility resolution", which meant that active fighters could not become members of the National Corps.

During the 2019 Ukrainian parliamentary election, the party formed a far-right political coalition alongside the Governmental Initiative of Yarosh, the Right Sector, and Svoboda parties. This coalition won a combined 2.15% of the nationwide electoral list vote but ultimately failed to win any seat in the Verkhovna Rada.

Youth Corps 
The Youth Corps (Yunatskyy Korpus) is a non-governmental organization engaged in the "patriotic upbringing" of children, and to take them once they grow up, to the National Militia of "Azov movement". Many members of the Youth Corps, beginning in 2015, organized summer camps where children and teenagers receive combat training mixed with lectures on Ukrainian nationalism.

National Militia, 2017–2020 
In 2017, a paramilitary group called the National Militia, closely linked to the Azov movement, was formed. Its stated aim was to assist law enforcement agencies, which is allowed under Ukrainian law, and it has conducted street patrols. In March 2019, its membership was reportedly "in the low thousands". On 29 January 2018, members of the National Militia stormed a municipal council meeting in Cherkasy, and refused to let officials leave the building until they had approved the city's long-delayed budget. In 2018, the National Militia carried out a series of attacks on Romani settlements.

The National Militia ceased its activities in 2020 and has been inactive since then. According to Michael Colborne, the National Militia has been de facto replaced by the Centuria group.

Centuria 
According to Oleksiy Kuzmenko, in a piece published for George Washington University's Institute for European, Russian, and Eurasian studies, the leadership of Centuria – a self-described "European traditionalist" group of military officers that aims to "defend" the "cultural and ethnic identity" of European peoples against "Brussels' politicos and bureaucrats" — has ties to the Azov movement. The organization "has promoted Azov to Hetman Petro Sahaidachny National Army Academy (NAA) cadets, and credibly claimed that its members lectured in the Azov Regiment of the National Guard, the military wing of the Azov movement." Belltower.News similarly states that Centuria has "close connections with the Ukrainian neo-Nazi scene" while both Belltower and Colborne say that Centuria is the successor organization to the National Militia.

The Jerusalem Post carried an article in October 2021 that cited Kuzmenko's report on the group,  which stated that it is "led by people with ties to" the Azov movement and that its members received training from Western countries while at the NAA.

Human rights violations

In 2016, Amnesty International and Human Rights Watch received several credible allegations of abuse and torture by the regiment. Reports published by the Office of the United Nations High Commissioner for Human Rights (OHCHR) documented looting of civilian homes and unlawful detention and torture of civilians between September 2014 and February 2015 "by Ukrainian armed forces and the Azov regiment in and around Shyrokyne".

Another OHCHR report documented an instance of rape and torture, writing: "A man with a mental disability was subject to cruel treatment, rape and other forms of sexual violence by 8 to 10 members of the 'Azov' and the 'Donbas Battalion' (another Ukrainian battalion) battalions in August–September 2014. The victim's health subsequently deteriorated and he was hospitalized in a psychiatric hospital." A report from January 2015 stated that a Donetsk Republic supporter was detained and tortured with electricity and waterboarding and struck repeatedly on his genitals, which resulted in his confessing to spying for pro-Russian militants.

Neo-Nazism 

The Azov Battalion has been described as a far-right militia, with connections to neo-Nazism and members wearing neo-Nazi and SS symbols and regalia, and expressing neo-Nazi views.

The unit's insignia features the Wolfsangel (or a mirrored variation of it), a German heraldic charge inspired by historic wolf traps adopted by the Nazi Party and by Wehrmacht and SS units. Its insignia also used to feature the Black Sun, both of which remain two popular neo-Nazi symbols. Azov soldiers have worn fascist or Nazi-associated symbols on their uniforms, including swastikas and SS symbols. In 2014, the German ZDF television network showed images of Azov fighters wearing helmets with swastika symbols and "the SS runes of Hitler's infamous black-uniformed elite corps". In 2015, Marcin Ogdowski, a Polish war correspondent, gained access to one of Azov's bases located in the former holiday resort Majak; Azov fighters showed him Nazi tattoos as well as Nazi emblems on their uniforms. According to political scientist Kacper Rekawek, an intention behind the use of such symbols during the war in Donbas especially in 2014 was to "intimidate, annoy, and provoke the Russians". The Reporting Radicalism initiative from Freedom House notes that "Accidental use of this symbol or its use without an understanding of its connotations (for example as a talisman) is rare", and ".. in Ukraine, the use of a Wolfsangel as a heraldic symbol or a traditional talisman would be uncharacteristic".

Members of the unit have stated that the inverted Wolfsangel (ꑭ), rather than connected to Nazism, represents the Ukrainian words for "united nation" or "national idea" (Ideya Natsii). This symbol has been historically used by far-right Ukrainian organizations: it was first used in 1991 by the Social-National Party of Ukraine until 2003 when the party purged their neonazi and other extremist elements rebranded itself into Svoboda, abandoning the symbol. It was used by the Patriot of Ukraine organization (many of whose members joined Azov in 2014) from 2003 to 2014 and the related Social-National Assembly party in 2014, both movements which claimed to continue the legacy of the original Social-National Party. It was also used by the minor party Ukrainian National Union in 2009. Andreas Umland, a scholar from the Stockholm Center for Eastern European Studies, told Deutsche Welle that though it had far-right connotations, the Wolfsangel was not considered a fascist symbol by the population in Ukraine. In 2022 political scientist Ivan Gomza wrote in Krytyka that the symbolism of the regiment had become associated with a "successful fighting unit that protects Ukraine", and wrote that other connotations are lost on most people in Ukraine.

The Guardian reported in 2014 that "many of [Azov's] members have links with neo-Nazi groups, and even those who laughed off the idea that they are neo-Nazis did not give the most convincing denials", citing swastika tattoos among the fighters and one who claimed to be a "national socialist". In March 2015, Andriy Diachenko, a spokesman for the Azov Regiment, told USA Today that "only 10% to 20%" of the unit's members are Nazis, and that this is their personal ideology not the official ideology of the unit; one commander attributed neo-Nazi ideology to misguided youth. According to The Daily Beast, some of the unit's members are "neo-Nazis, white supremacists, and avowed anti-Semites", and (in 2017) "numerous swastika tattoos of different members and their tendency to go into battle with swastikas or SS insignias drawn on their helmets make it very difficult for other members of the group to plausibly deny any neo-Nazi affiliations." Ukrainian affairs writer Lev Golinkin wrote in The Nation in 2019 that "Post-Maidan Ukraine is the world's only nation to have a neo-Nazi formation in its armed forces."

Bellingcat, an investigative journalist group, has traced ties between the Azov movement and American white supremacist groups. Michael Colborne of Bellingcat, writing in Foreign Policy in 2019, called the Azov movement "a dangerous neo-Nazi-friendly extremist movement" with "global ambitions", citing similarities between the group's ideology and symbolism and that of the 2019 Christchurch mosque shooter, along with efforts by the group to recruit American right-wing extremists. In a 2020 Atlantic Council article, Bellingcat's Oleskiy Kuzmenko wrote that the far right in general significantly damaged Ukraine's international reputation creating a vulnerability to hostile narratives that exaggerate its role.

Since 2017, the official position of the Ukrainian government is that the unit has depoliticized itself. The then Minister of Internal Affairs Arsen Avakov claimed that "The shameful information campaign about the alleged spread of Nazi ideology (among Azov members) is a deliberate attempt to discredit the 'Azov' unit and the National Guard of Ukraine." In March 2022, in an open letter to Russia published through Russian journalist Alexander Nevzorov, Azov Regiment strongly denounced allegations of its neo-Nazi orientation, defining Nazism as a "tireless need to exterminate those who dared to be free" and noting that the regiment incorporated people of many ethnicities and religions, including Ukrainians, Russians, Jews, Muslims, Greeks, Georgians, Crimean Tatars and Belarusians. According to the letter, Nazism, as well Stalinism, were "despised" by the regiment, since Ukraine greatly suffered from both.

Some commentators concur that the unit has depoliticised. A 2015 Reuters report noted that after the unit's inclusion in the National Guard and receipt of heavier equipment, Andriy Biletsky toned down his usual rhetoric, while most of the extremist leadership had left to focus on political careers in the National Corps party or the Azov Civil Corps. An article published by Foreign Affairs in 2017 argued that the unit was relatively depoliticized and deradicalized after it was brought into the fold of the National Guard of Ukraine. The government started a process with the objective of ferreting out neo-nazis and foreign fighters, with background checks, observations during training, and a law requiring all fighters to accept Ukrainian citizenship. A former USAID official commented that the real danger was not the original paramilitary group, but the civil movement Azov had spawned. In the years following its integration into the National Guard a number of experts and commentators have stated that the radical right-wing ideology associated with the battalion has become more marginal, or that it does not make sense to describe it as a "neo-Nazi" regiment.

In February 2020, the Atlantic Council published an article by Anton Shekhovtsov, a scholar of right-wing extremism in Europe and expert on Russia's connections to Europe's far-right. Shekhovtsov argued that Azov should not be designated a foreign terrorist organization, for reasons including that it was a regiment of the Ukrainian National Guard, and therefore was part of official structures and followed orders given by the Interior Ministry, and that some claimed extremist links to Brenton Tarrant, the Rise Above Movement, and American right-wing terrorists in general were poorly evidenced. He also told the Financial Times that though it was originally formed by leadership of a neo-nazi group, "It is certain that Azov [the battalion] has depoliticised itself. Its history linked to the far-right movement is pretty irrelevant today." In a 2020 article on the Atlantic Council's website, however, Oleksiy Kuzmenko of Bellingcat argued that "the Regiment has failed in its alleged attempts to 'depoliticize.'" Shekhovtsov, writing in the Euromaidan Press in 2022 reiterated his view that the Azov Regiment had become largely depoliticized and had lost most of its neo-Nazi and far-right views, describing it as "a highly professional detachment for specific operations. Neither a political organization, nor a militia, nor a far-right battalion".

Following the start of the 2022 Russian invasion of Ukraine, The Washington Post painted a picture of a group aware of its origins, and still with a far-right adherent commander and some extremist members, but much changed from its origins. Many recruits joining the regiment are well aware of its past, and join up for various reasons, including Azov's positive reputation for training new recruits. While extremist elements remain, it is less driven by ideology than it was at its formation, and the chief motivation now is patriotism, and anger at Russian provocations and the attack on Ukraine. People come from all over the world driven by outrage against Putin, and not because of a particular ideology. Michael Colborne wrote in 2022 that he "wouldn't call [the Azov Movement] explicitly a neo-Nazi movement" although there are "clearly neo-Nazis within its ranks".

In a similar vein, Andreas Umland said in 2022, that "In 2014 this battalion had indeed a far-right background, these were far-right racists that founded the battalion" but it had since become "de-ideologised" and a regular fighting unit. Its recruits now join not because of ideology but because "it has the reputation of being a particularly tough fighting unit," Umland said. Vyacheslav Likhachev, another leading expert on the far-right, writing for a blog called The Ukrainian View, stated in May 2022 that there are no grounds for describing Azov as a neo-Nazi unit, underlining that "by the end of 2014, most far-right fighters left the regiment. The rest of the right-wing radicals who openly articulated their views were deliberately “cleansed” by the new regiment command in 2017" and that several Jewish members (including one Israeli citizen) are currently serving in the regiment.

In an interview with The Kyiv Independent, Ilya Samoilenko, an Azov officer, stated that while he acknowledged the regiment's 'obscure past', he and other members had chosen to leave the past behind when they integrated with the mainstream Ukrainian military. Similarly, in an interview with Israeli newspaper Haaretz, Azov deputy commander Svyatoslav Palamar denied the regiment being a neo-Nazi formation and said: "“What is Nazism? When someone thinks that one nation is superior to another nation, when someone thinks he has a right to invade another country and destroy its inhabitants... We believe in our country’s territorial integrity. We have never attacked anyone, and we have not wanted to do that."

In April 2022, Israeli historian and Nazi hunter Efraim Zuroff dismissed the claims that allegations made against the Azov regiment are part of a Russian disinformation. He explained in an interview with the Ottawa Citizen: "It's not Russian propaganda, far from it. These people are neo-Nazis. There is an element of the ultra-right in Ukraine and it's absurd to ignore it."

In June 2022, Colborne told Haaretz that the battalion has gone through changes over the years. After the first few years that the battalion was founded, only a small minority had far right connections. He noted that today, these numbers are even smaller and the use of neo-Nazi symbols among its members has been reduced greatly.

In late February 2022, the Ukrainian National Guard released a video appearing to show an Azov fighter greasing bullets in pig fat to be used against the Kadyrovites, the forces of Ramzan Kadyrov (since Chechens are often Muslim and pork consumption is forbidden by Islamic law). This followed the announcement from Kadyrov of their deployment in Ukraine and displays of their combat readiness.

Connection to antisemitism 
The founder of the battalion, Andriy Biletsky, said in 2010 that the Ukrainian nation's mission is to "lead the white races of the world in a final crusade … against Semite-led Untermenschen". According to the Freedom House initiative, Reporting Radicalism, said Biletsky stopped making anti-Semitic statements after February 2014. But it said "anti-Semitism is sometimes manifested at the local level" of his political party.

In 2016 the Vaad, a Ukrainian Jewish communal body consisting of a number of different organizations, supported the lifting of a US ban on funding the Azov regiment. Representing the Vaad, antisemitism researcher Vyacheslav Likhachev told The Jerusalem Post, "It must be clearly understood; there is no kind of 'neo-Nazi Ukrainian militia' now. Azov is a regular military unit subordinate to the Ministry of Internal Affairs. It is not irregular division neither  a political group. Its commanders and fighters might have personal political views as individuals, but as an armed police unit Azov is a part of the system of the Ukrainian defense forces."

Some Ukrainian Jewish people support and serve in the Azov Regiment. A 2018 BBC report gave the example of one of its most prominent members, co-founder Nathan Khazin, a leader of the "Jewish hundreds" during the 2013 Euromaidan protests in Kyiv. Khazin and his supporters in the regiment often display the flag of the Ukrainian Insurgent Army with a Star of David added onto it. Jewish-Ukrainian billionaire Ihor Kolomoyskyi was the main source of Azov's funding before it was incorporated into the National Guard.

In 2022, in a commentary published by the Center of Civil Liberties, antisemitism researcher Vyacheslav Likhachev said that despite Mariupol's fairly large Jewish community, there had not been any incidents between members of the Azov Regiment and the Jewish community since 2014. Colborne's June interview with Haaretz included mention that the Azov Battalion and the entire Azov movement are almost completely untainted by antisemitism. He said that not only for Azov, but for all the far-right movements in Ukraine, especially since 2014, antisemitism has lost its importance.

International arms and training controversies

United States 

In March 2015, Ukrainian Interior Minister Arsen Avakov announced that the Azov Regiment would be among the first units to be trained by United States Army troops in the Operation Fearless Guardian training mission. US training however was withdrawn on 12 June 2015, as the US House of Representatives passed an amendment blocking any aid (including arms and training) to the regiment due to its neo-Nazi background. However, the amendment was later removed in November 2015, with James Carden writing in The Nation that an "official familiar with the debate" told him that the "House Defense Appropriations Committee came under pressure from the Pentagon to remove the Conyers-Yoho amendment from the text of the bill." The decision was opposed by the Simon Wiesenthal Center which stated that lifting the ban highlighted the danger of Holocaust distortion in Ukraine, and by a Likud MP, but supported by Ukraine's Jewish community.

In 2018, the U.S. House of Representatives again passed a provision blocking any training of Azov members by American forces, citing its neo-Nazi connections.

In October 2019, members of the US House of Representatives from the Democratic Party requested that the Azov Regiment and two other far-right groups be classified as a Foreign Terrorist Organization by the US State Department, citing recent acts of right-wing violence such as the Christchurch mosque shootings earlier that year. The request spurred protests by Azov's supporters in Ukraine. Ultimately the regiment was not placed into the foreign terrorist organisation list. In June 2022, U.S. Representative Jason Crow, who signed the 2019 letter, told The Wall Street Journal that he was "not aware of any information that currently shows a direct connection [of Azov fighters] to extremism now", also adding "I am sensitive to the fact that the past isn’t necessarily prologue here, that groups can change and evolve and that the war might have changed the organization."

In early 2022, during the Russian invasion of Ukraine, the US continued to officially ban arms support to Azov via the yearly Consolidated Appropriations Act, 2022 following the 2018 provision. However, prominent lawmakers, when pressed about monitoring this rule, stated "our main goal is to aid the Ukrainians in their defense", according to Senator Richard Blumenthal of the US Senate Armed Services Committee.

Canada
In June 2015, the Canadian defense minister declared that Canadian forces would not provide training or support to the Azov Regiment.

There is mounting evidence that Canada helped train members of Centuria (a far-right group of military officers, tied to Azov movement and regiment). This was during Operation UNIFIER, a $890 million project to train the Armed Forces of Ukraine. In 2021, a report from George Washington University discovered that extremists from this group were bragging about being trained by Canadian forces. In addition, an investigation by Ottawa Citizen discovered that Canadian officials met with leaders from Azov Battalion in 2018, and that Canadian officials did not denounce the unit's neo-Nazi beliefs. Canadian officials were more concerned that the media would expose the meeting. Canadian officers and diplomats were photographed with battalion officials which was subsequently used as propaganda by Azov. CTV News found evidence on the social media account of an Azov leader of the unit's members training with Canadian instructors in 2019. The Canadian military has denied any knowledge that extremists were trained by Canadian forces.

Israel
In 2018, more than 40 Israeli human rights activists signed a petition to stop arms sales to Ukraine, saying there was evidence some of these arms might end up in the hands of the forces that the activists said openly espouse a neo-Nazi ideology, such as the Azov militia. In 2022, The Jerusalem Post raised concerns about the MATADOR small anti-armor missile, co-produced by Israel, being shown in videos fired by a fighter from what it characterized as "the Neo-Nazi Azov Battalion".

Greece
In April 2022, a controversy occurred in Greece when Ukraine's president Volodymyr Zelenskyy appeared with a soldier from the Azov Regiment via video link to address the Hellenic Parliament. This soldier had allegedly been chosen to speak on the destruction of Mariupol because of his Greek ethnicity and knowledge of the language. The appearance caused outrage by opposition parties SYRIZA and KINAL and was labelled a "provocation" because of the association of the Azov Regiment with neo-Nazism. , spokesperson of the Greek Government, said the inclusion of the Azov Regiment message was “incorrect and inappropriate”, but criticized SYRIZA for using the incident for political gain.

Use in Russian propaganda and information campaigns

Pre-2022 

The regiment, along with other similar groups, have been central to Russia's narrative that there is a Nazi influence that permeates Ukraine, justifying intervention by the Russian armed forces in efforts to "denazify" it. The unit is regularly singled out by Russia as proof the Ukrainian armed forces is plagued with neo-Nazism. This narrative has been a part of Russian propaganda since the annexation of Crimea in 2014, according to Russia scholar Izabella Tabarovsky of the Wilson Center, who said "there has been an intensive campaign of demonization, a certain resonance for Putin’s core supporters in Russia" because "there is a national historical memory formed around World War II and the victory over Nazis. It is a strong part of the [Russian] national identity."

During the early days of the war in Donbas, mostly in 2015–2017, Azov was featured in various fabricated videos by Russia and Russia-linked groups. Shortly before 2016 Dutch Ukraine–European Union Association Agreement referendum, a video appeared of fighters supposedly from Azov. In it, the fighters burned a Dutch flag and threatened terrorist strikes if the referendum failed. They said "We will find you everywhere: in the cinema, at work, in your bedroom, public transport, we have our guys in the Netherlands, ready to follow any order." The video, according to a Bellingcat investigation, was produced and distributed by the Internet Research Agency and spread virally before being posted by the group that sponsored the referendum. In another instance, CyberBerkut, which portrayed itself as disgruntled Ukrainians but was later linked to the GRU, leaked a fabricated video portraying ISIS soldiers supposedly fighting in Azov. According to the Atlantic Council's Digital Forensic Research Lab, this was part of a broader narrative surrounding Muslim soldiers in various of the Ukrainian Armed Forces, most notably the Crimean Tatars. In another video, a follow up to the atrocity propaganda Crucified boy-series of videos, acting as "punishers", members of Azov supposedly crucify and burn a separatist. Some of these resurfaced once again after the 2022 invasion on social media.

During the War in Donbas, the unit was represented as similar in composition to the unit in the 2014–2015 timeframe, despite international observers in Donbas and other people saying otherwise. Especially in parts of central/eastern Europe, this was potentiated with manipulated imagery on social media, and the appearance of pro-Kremlin propaganda that mirrored pejorative language used in Russian media that painted Ukraine as a fascist aggressor against a Russian minority. In addition, Azov was attributed as responsible for a significant portion of the civilian deaths in Donbas.

2022 invasion 

In justifying the 2022 invasion of Ukraine by Russia, the narrative oriented around Ukrainian neo-Nazism continued, and the Azov Regiment has similarly played a central role under the pretext of "denazifying" Ukraine, with Russian media claiming its overwhelming presence and influence within Ukraine to paint a picture of the whole of the Ukrainian government and military as under Nazi control. In addition, another of Russia's claimed justifications for its invasion was that members of the Azov Regiment in Mariupol were responsible for war crimes. Chief Spokesman Igor Konashenkov of Russia's Ministry of Defence claimed: "It was these Azov Battalion Nazis who had been exterminating civilian population in Donetsk and Luhansk republics, deliberately and with exceptional cruelty, for eight years."

Russian leaders have sometimes made aggressive denouncements of Ukrainian nationalism, using the presence of "crazed nationalistic battalions" using rhetorical tactics reminiscent of tsarist or soviet era when Ukrainian identity was often depressed. For example, former Russian President and Prime Minister Dmitry Medvedev said "to dehumanise and denigrate Russia, “the crazed beasts of the nationalist and territorial defense battalions are ready to kill Ukrainian civilians”; all because “the very essence of Ukrainianness, fed by anti-Russian venom and lies about its identity, is one big sham”. Ukrainian identity does not exist and never has".

Azov has also featured in Chinese social media and news outlets in a similar fashion to Russian media. Azov's connections to neo-Nazism are often depicted as indicative of the views of Ukrainian society more widely despite Azov Regiment being a fringe group. After the war started, Chinese media attempted to link imagery of some Azov veterans in the 2019–2020 Hong Kong protests as proof the US was funding members of Azov to attend rallies and sow discord. According to radicalism researcher Vyacheslav Likhachev, these were people who participated as part of the group "Honor", which he no longer considers far right.

During the Siege of Mariupol, Russia was accused of using the presence of Azov in the battle as justification for war crimes. Russian foreign minister Sergey Lavrov justified the Mariupol hospital airstrike claiming the Azov was using the hospital as a base and had previously evicted the patients and staff. On 16 March, the Donetsk Regional Drama Theatre, which was sheltering almost 1,300 civilians, was struck and largely destroyed by an airstrike. Russia denied the bombings and claimed that the Azov Regiment took civilians as hostages inside the building and bombed the theater themselves to frame Russia. This was sharply disputed by Pavlo Kyrylenko, head of Donetsk region administration, who asserted that "the Russians are already lying, [saying] that the headquarters of the Azov Regiment was there. But they themselves are well aware that there were only civilians." Due to the increased prevalence of factchecking websites, Russia, in counter-disinformation, utilized fake fact checking websites to counter common narratives in the west. For example, in the case of the Mariupol theater bombing, the Russian Ministry of Foreign Affairs started linking to a site that declared the images, videos and foreign news reports that attributed it to a Russian airstrike as fake, and instead, the site was used to add credence to the narrative Azov had mined the building.

After the discovery of the Bucha massacre following the end of the Battle of Kyiv, Russia and Russian media offered multiple contradictory explanations, in an approach disinformation experts called a “scattershot approach”. In one of these narratives, Russian media claimed people associated with Azov and/or Azov fighters killed anyone not wearing a pro-Ukrainian blue ribbon after Russian troops left. International media have disproved this timeline using other evidence. The Azov-Kyiv territorial defense unit had been in the Kyiv area, according to Maksym Zhorin.

In a post on 20 April 2022, Russian journalist  wrote on his Telegram page, Комиссар Исчезает (The Commissar Vanishes), that following the Russian occupation of Mariupol, Azov leaders such as Prokopenko should be publicly executed and their bodies left to hang "as a reminder of who was in charge."

The Russian Supreme Court scheduled a hearing for 29 June 2022, on whether or not to classify the Azov regiment a terrorist organization, which was  subsequently rescheduled to 2 August 2022. On 2 August, the Supreme Court declared the regiment as a terrorist organization. This allows for harsher penalties to be imposed on members of the Azov Regiment. Members face up to 10 years in jail while leaders face up to 20 years.

See also

References

Notes

Further reading 
 
 
 
 
 2017 article by Margaret Klein for Swedish Defence Research Agency
 2017 TV report "Women and the Azov battalion in Kyiv" by Deutsche Welle

External links 
 

2014 establishments in Ukraine
Far-right movements in Europe
History of Donetsk Oblast
Military units and formations established in 2014
Neo-Nazism in Ukraine
Paramilitary forces of Ukraine
Volunteer National Guard units of Ukraine
Military units and formations of the Russo-Ukrainian War
Donbas
Organizations designated as terrorist by Russia
Propaganda in Ukraine